Mohammad Hossain Mondol (1935 – 19 June 2018) was a renowned Bangladeshi agriculturist and researcher. He received the Independence Award in 2015 for his unique contribution to research and training.

Early life
Islam was born in Tengra village of Palashbari Upazila, Gaibandha District.

Career
Islam has served as the Director General of Bangladesh Agricultural Research Institute.

Islam received the Independence Day Award in 2015 in recognition of his unique contribution to research and training.

References

2017 deaths
1935 births
Bangladeshi agriculturalists
People from Gaibandha District
Recipients of the Independence Day Award